Genghis Khan and the Making of the Modern World (2004) is a history book written by Jack Weatherford, Dewitt Wallace Professor of Anthropology at Macalester College. It is a narrative of the rise and influence of Mongol leader Genghis Khan and his successors, and their influence on European civilization. Weatherford provides a different slant on Genghis Khan than has been typical in most Western accounts, attributing positive cultural effects to his rule.

In the last section, he reviews the historiography of Genghis Khan in the West and argues that the leader's early portrayal in writings as an "excellent, noble king" changed to that of a brutal pagan during the Age of Enlightenment. Weatherford made use of three major non-Western sources: The Secret History of the Mongols, the Ta' rīkh-i jahān-gushā of Juvayni and the Jami al-Tawarikh of Rashid-al-Din Hamadani.

Background
In 1979 Paul Ratchnevsky wrote about the Khan's knack for forging alliances, his fairness in dividing the spoils, and his patronage of the sciences. Similarly, Saunders and H. H. Howorth have argued that the Mongol empire contributed to opening up intellectual interactions between China, the Middle East, and Europe.

The book suggests that the western depiction of the Mongols as savages who destroyed civilization was due to the Mongols' approach to dealing with the competing leadership classes. The Mongols practiced killing the ruling classes in order to subdue the general population, a technique used by other cultures as well. Survivors of the upper classes wrote the histories and expressed resentment of Mongol brutality toward them. Weatherford explores the Mongol treatment of the general population (peasants, tradesmen, merchants) under Mongol rule. He suggests their rule was less burdensome than that of European nobility due to lighter taxes, tolerance of local customs and religions, more rational administration, and universal education for boys.

These benefits were enjoyed only by populations who surrendered immediately to the Mongol invaders. Those populations that resisted could be massacred as a warning to other towns/cities. These massacres were a method of psychological warfare to alert those populations not yet conquered. The resulting terror helped color the historical portrayal of the Mongols.

Since the Mongols were nomadic horsemen of the steppes, they were dependent on taxes from the subjugated peoples for wealth and luxury goods. Weatherford's book claims that the Mongols sought to increase that wealth by encouraging their subjects to be more productive and enterprising instead of increasing the tax burden on them. They did this by sponsoring lucrative international trade. He says that they encouraged scientific advances, and improved agriculture and production methods. Many innovations came from the combination of technologies from different cultures within their huge empire.

Legacy of the Mongols
Weatherford explores Genghis Khan's legacy and influence; he attributes many aspects of the Renaissance, such as the spread of paper and printing, the compass, gunpowder and musical instruments such as the violin, to the influence of trade enabled by Genghis Khan and the Mongol Empire. Weatherford suggests that the European Renaissance was a rebirth, not of Greece or Rome, but of concepts from the Mongol Empire. He notes the following:

 Astronomy: "New knowledge from the travel writings of Marco Polo to the detailed star charts of Ulugh Beg proved that much of [the Western] received classical knowledge was simply wrong."  p. 236
 Paper money: experiments in Persian Il-Khanate (p. 204-5), also p. 236
 Art: The Franciscans, who had wide contacts with the Mongol court, and Mongol/Persian art influenced Giotto di Bondone and his disciples, so much so that St. Francis was depicted in Mongol dress - "literally wrapped in silk".  Also, in a 1306 illustration of the Robe of Christ in Padua, the golden trim was painted in Mongol letters from the square Phagspa script commissioned by Khublai Khan (p. 237-8)
 Democracy and Government: Suggests that some of Kublai Khan's reforms in China, which localized power and gave political strength to individual farms, was the first democratic experience in China. It was revived only when the Republicans and Communists began to reintroduce local government. The author also suggests that the tribal government of the Mongols had many democratic elements. He refers to Mongol leaders being selected by council (khuriltai) as "elections", although, these like the Athenian or Roman versions (or early United States election of senators by state legislatures), may be more properly called election by an elite (an oligarchy).  In addition, he repeatedly declares that the Khans ruled through the will of the people.
 Globalization: Military- They created battle tactics and used method to conquer. Mongolian armies only carried what they needed mainly because they carried information crucial to conquering foreign armies. The trebuchet was an invaluable Medieval siege attack weapon, similar to a catapult, which was used for hurling heavy stones to smash castle or city walls. When traditional Mongol weapons and tactics no longer were effective when attacking cities, Genghis Khan made changes; he adopted large weapons from the Persian, Chinese, and Arabs and developed new strategies. According to the book “The Mongols devised and used weapons from the different cultures with whom they had contact, and through accumulation of knowledge, they created a global arsenal that could be adapted to whatever situations they encountered.” 
 Religion: Mongols were highly tolerant of most religions during the early Mongol Empire, and typically sponsored several at the same time. At the time of Genghis Khan in the 13th century, virtually every religion had found converts, from Buddhism to Christianity and Manicheanism to Islam. To avoid strife, Genghis Khan set up an institution that ensured complete religious freedom, though he himself was a shamanist. Under his administration, all religious leaders were exempt from taxation, and from public service. Genghis Khan also globalized the Mongol army by recruiting many people outside of the Mongol empire. Genghis Khan and his army battled many empires such as the Chinese, Russian, Khwarazm and more. As Genghis Khan conquered these empires, he used torture as a form of punishment but with lesser severity. He used such tactics as intimidation but at the same time convinced many people to join his Mongol army and gained respect. Through such tactics, Genghis Khan revolutionized traditional military tactics and created a more hybridized, multicultural army to defeat and conquer other empires.
 Important: Ganghis Khan was known for saying "everything is temporary," which has often been said to be his family motto.

Weatherford argues that the Mongol Empire was the impetus for the European Age of Discovery. Europeans two centuries later were trying to reclaim the lucrative global trade that was lost when the Mongol Empire collapsed.

Weatherford attributes the following to Genghis Khan's rule: 
 Unprecedented religious tolerance
 Low level of discrimination toward other races
 Low level of meddling with local customs and culture
 The idea of rule by consensus within Mongol tribes
 Culture of meritocracy 
 Culture that believed in the rule of law
 Strong sponsorship of Eurasian trade
 Building of roads to support trade
 First culture to promote universal literacy
 First international postal system
 First widespread use of paper money
 Reduction of the use of torture in the penal system
 Belief in diplomatic immunity for ambassadors/envoys

Historiography of Genghis Khan
Chapter 10 of the book traces the record on Genghis Khan in European texts.  In the early years, certain writers appear impressed with him. In the following centuries, Genghis was characterized as a barbarian. In addition, scientists claimed the oriental race was biologically inferior to Europeans.

Adulation
During the late Mongol Empire, most European nations had established different degrees of trade relations with it. Weatherford writes that Europeans at this time portrayed the Mongols positively. For instance, Mongol envoys such as Rabban Bar Sawma, (p. 218-219) were received by the crowned heads of Europe.  Weatherford refers to the writings of Bar Sawma to document his surprise at the lack of religious freedom in Europe; the Mongol Empire tolerated heterogeneity.

Geoffrey Chaucer, who had travelled widely in Europe, writing in the "Tale of the Squire", Canterbury Tales (14th century), said: "This noble king was known as Cambinskan / noble king of great renown / That there was nowhere in the wide world known / So excellent a lord in everything". The great ruler resided in Old Sarai (modern Russia, then Golden Horde), which was colonized by Mongolians and Batu Khan.

Denigration
Weatherford suggests that the view of Genghis Khan changed during the 18th century among Enlightenment authors:

Whereas the Renaissance writers and explorers treated Genghis Khan and the Mongols with open adulation, the eighteenth century Enlightenment in Europe produced a growing anti-Asian spirit that often focused on the Mongols, in particular, as the symbol of everything evil or defective...

He notes that Montesquieu wrote of the Mongols that, having "destroyed Asia, from India even to the Mediterranean; and all the country which forms the east of Persia they have rendered a desert." (The spirit of the Laws, 1748)

Voltaire, in adapting a Mongol dynasty play as an allegory on the present French king, described the Mongols as "wild sons of rapine, who live in tents, in chariots, and in the fields." They "detest our arts, our customs, and our laws; and therefore mean to change them all; to make this splendid seat of empire one vast desert, like their own."

The widely influential French naturalist Comte de Buffon, in his encyclopedia of natural history, disparaged the Mongol physique, and described the people as "alike strangers to religion, morality, and decency. They are robbers by profession." Translated from French into many European languages, his work became one of the classic sources of information during the 18th and 19th centuries.

The Scottish scientist Robert Chambers wrote: 
The leading characters of the various races of mankind are simply representatives of particular stages in the development of the highest or Caucasian type. ... [in comparison, the] Mongolian is an arrested infant newly born.

People suffering what is now known as Down's syndrome, which can cause mental retardation, were characterized as having physical facial features like Mongols, and were described as "arrested children".

Re-evaluation
One of the first to re-evaluate Genghis Khan was the Indian statesman Jawaharlal Nehru. In a series of letters on world history written to his daughter from British jails in the 1930s, he wrote "Chengiz is, without doubt, the greatest military genius and leader in history.... Alexander and Caesar seem petty before him."

In 2005, Peter Jackson published The Mongols and the West, 1221–1410, an academic work on the Catholic West and the Mongol Empire in the Middle Ages. Antti Ruotsala, a reviewer, noted that most re-evaluation of the Mongols up to that time had been done by German scholars, whose work was not widely available in the West.

Reception of the book 
In a 2005 review, Timothy May wrote that some of Weatherford's thesis was "without question, controversial". Nevertheless, Weatherford "presents his case very eloquently and with an abundance of evidence demonstrating not only the indirect influence of the Mongols in Europe but also the transformation of the Mongols from agents of innovation in the Renaissance into agents of destruction in the European mind during Enlightenment." He notes that the book lacks footnotes, and notations in the back are hard to follow and lacking in many cases. In addition, he writes, "While the overall thrust of the book is on target and may promote new discourse on the influence of the Mongols in history, it is undermined by numerous mistakes." May recommended against the book's use in history classes, although noting that the book is well written and engaging. 

On the other hand, in a 2016 review, Simon Winchester praised "this fine and fascinating book". He appreciated in his review for the New York Times that "Weatherford's writings present us revisionist history on a grand scale, but one as scrupulously well researched (with ample endnotes) as such an intellectual overhaul needs to be".. Kirkus Reviews wrote: "Weatherford's lively analysis restores the Mongol's reputation, and it takes wonderful learned detours. ... Well written and full of surprises.”

The book stayed on the New York Times Bestseller List for two weeks in 2004. In a tournament of audiobooks by Audible.com, the book was honored in 2011 as a champion, together with Karl Marlantes' Matterhorn. It was the book of the week by CNN in 2011. On 12 October 2014, the book ranked at 6 on the New York Times e-book bestseller list.

References

Further reading
Antti Ruotsala, Europeans and Mongols in the Middle of the Thirteenth Century: Encountering the Other, (Helsinki, 2001)

2004 non-fiction books
Books about Genghis Khan
21st-century history books
History books about Mongolia